The Coldwater River is located in south central British Columbia, Canada. It is the largest tributary of the Nicola River, which it joins at the city of Merritt. Its traditional native name is Ntstlatko ("cold water").

Course
The Coldwater River originates in the Cascade Mountains west of Coquihalla Pass. Its headwaters flow from Zupjok Peak and other high mountains such as Llama Peak, Alpaca Peak, Vicuña Peak, and Guanaco Peak. It flows generally north for  before passing over and through the town of Merritt along what was formerly Pine Street, it then joins the Nicola River. Major tributary creeks include Midday, Voght, Brook, Juliet, and July.

The river flows under the Coquihalla Highway at the Kingvale Interchange. The Coquihalla Highway runs through most of the Coldwater's valley, as do gas and oil pipelines. Canadian Pacific Railway tracks run along the northern part of the river.

The river flows through two Nlaka'pamux Indian reserves belonging to the Coldwater Indian Band: the Coldwater Indian Reserve 1 and Paul's Basin Indian Reserve 2.

Ecology
The river passes through two biogeoclimatic zones over its course.  In its upper reaches, it passes through the Interior Douglas Fir Zone.  As it passes into the Coldwater Valley bottom, the region changes to the drier Ponderosa Pine/Bunch Grass Zone.

Fish species
Several species of Pacific salmon are present, including coho, chinook, and steelhead.  Non-salmon species include bull trout, Rocky Mountain whitefish, longnose dace, redside shiner, bridgelip sucker, slimy sculpin, prickly sculpin, Pacific lamprey, leopard dace, longnose sucker, and rainbow trout.

See also
 List of tributaries of the Fraser River

References

Canadian Cascades
Nicola Country
Rivers of British Columbia
Tributaries of the Fraser River
Kamloops Division Yale Land District